Roughfort is a small village in County Antrim, Northern Ireland. It is within the townland of Craigarogan and the Newtownabbey Borough Council area. In the 2001 Census it had a population of 216 people.

References 
NI Neighbourhood Information System
Roughfort Motte

See also 
List of towns and villages in Northern Ireland

Villages in County Antrim